Sakakura (written: 坂倉 or 阪倉) is a Japanese surname. Notable people with the surname include:

, Japanese architect
, Japanese footballer and manager

Japanese-language surnames